The Clowns Gallery-Museum is a museum of clowning. Established in 1959, the collection contains costumes and props from famous clowns, as well as a reference library,  and is home to the Clown Egg Register.

History 
The collection is split between the museum's two sites, the Holy Trinity Church, Dalston, and Wookey Hole, Somerset, England. The museum was established in 1959 in Dalston and the collection was split into a venue in Wookey Hole in 2007. The Dalston museum is situated in what was the vestry of the Holy Trinity Church.  It was threatened with closure in 2014 but remained in place. The Wookey Hole museum is run by Gerry Cottle, vice president of Clowns International.

Clown Egg Register 
The Clown Egg Register is an archive of painted ceramic and hen's eggs that serve as a record of individual clowns' personal make-up designs. The clown egg tradition began in 1946, when Stan Bult, a chemist, and founder of Clowns International, took to drawing the faces of club members and famous clowns onto chicken eggs. The egg gallery was created because according to an unofficial rule, no two clowns are allowed to have the same makeup. In order to ensure that clowns weren't copying each other's makeup style, the practice of painting each unique design onto an egg began. Real eggs were originally used but were later replaced with ceramic eggs. The gallery is open on the first Friday of each month.

References in Social Media 
- The museum is mentioned by Spencer Reid in season 13 episode 17 of the American crime drama Criminal Minds.

- The museum is additionally mentioned in Terry Pratchett's Discworld series book "Men at Arms"

References

External links

Museums in the London Borough of Hackney
Clowning
1959 establishments in the United Kingdom
Dalston